Way Too Long may refer to:

 "Way Too Long" (Audio Bullys song), 2003
 "Way Too Long" (Nathan Dawe, Anne-Marie and MoStack song), 2021